The 29th annual Annie Awards honoring animation excellence in 2001. Shrek became the big winner of 2001, taking eight of its twelve nominations, including the Best Animated Feature.

Best Animated Feature
Winner:
 Shrek-DreamWorks
Nominees:
 Osmosis Jones-Warner Bros.
 Blood: The Last Vampire-Production I.G
 The Emperor's New Groove-Walt Disney Pictures

Best Animated Short Subject
Winner:
 Hubert's Brain-WildBrain Inc.
Nominees:
 Mr. Digital Tokoro #1542-Nippon TV
 Rejected-Don Hertzfeldt
 Stubble Trouble-Calabash Animation
 'Tenacious D: Fuck Her Gently-Spümcø

Other awardsThe Emperor's New Groove nabbed three awards: one for  Voice Acting in a Feature Production (female category) with Eartha Kitt as Yzma, Character Animation for Dale Baer on said character and best song.

Other winners included Eddie Murphy for the role of Donkey in Shrek, The Simpsons, Futurama, Invader Zim, Kathy Najimy for her role as Peggy Hill in King of the Hill, Batman Beyond: Return of the Joker and The Powerpuff Girls''.

June Foray Award
 Leonard Maltin

Winsor McCay Award
 Bob Givens
 Pete Alvadaro
 Bill Justice

External links
  on IMDb

References

Annie Awards ceremonies
2001 film awards
2001 awards in the United States